Ida B. Wells Continuation High School is a public high school in San Francisco, California located near the Hayes Valley neighborhood. The school belongs to the San Francisco Unified School District.

History 
Constructed in 1911, the high school was first known as the Denman School.

Since 1992, the school has been named in honor of Ida B. Wells.

The school shut down for renovations in December 2014 and the students relocated to the John O'Connell High School campus until 2016 where then they reported back to the newly updated school.

Student activities

Athletics 
The school does not offer any sports to their students, but students are able to and encouraged to participate on a team sport that belongs to another school in the district.

Culinary Arts 
Heat of the Kitchen is a culinary arts program offered at the school that teaches students teamwork and how to cook. The class is headed by a local chef who was approached by a previous principal who saw the impact Chef Cravens was making on her students.

Statistics

Demographics 
2016-17

Enrollment by Subgroup 2016-17

References 

High schools in San Francisco
Public high schools in California
Educational institutions established in 1911
1911 establishments in California